Robert Thwaits (also Thwayts and Thwaytes) was an English medieval academic administrator.

Thwaits was the Vice-Chancellor of Oxford University on 1441 and 1453.  He was the Chancellor of Oxford University during 1445–6. From 1450 until 1465, he was the Master of Balliol College, Oxford.

References

Bibliography
 

Year of birth missing
Year of death missing
Vice-Chancellors of the University of Oxford
Chancellors of the University of Oxford
Masters of Balliol College, Oxford
15th-century English people